Teofila Fedorovna Romanovich (1842-1924) was a Ukrainian stage actor and theatre director. 

She was the manager of the Ukrainian Discourse Theatre in 1874 – 1880.

References

 Романович Теофіла Федорівна // Шевченківська енциклопедія: — Т.5:Пе—С : у 6 т. / Гол. ред. М. Г. Жулинський.. — Київ : Ін-т літератури ім. Т. Г. Шевченка, 2015. — С. 519.

1842 births
1924 deaths
19th-century Ukrainian actresses
19th-century theatre managers